Borujerd County is in Lorestan province, Iran. The capital of the county is the city of Borujerd. At the 2006 census, the county's population was 320,547 in 82,676 households. The following census in 2011 counted 337,631 people in 99,259 households. At the 2016 census, the county's population was 326,452 in 102,258 households.

Administrative divisions

The population history of Borujerd County's administrative divisions over three consecutive censuses is shown in the following table. The latest census shows two districts, seven rural districts, and two cities.

References

 

Counties of Lorestan Province